Condensing may refer to:
Condensation
Condensing steam locomotive
Condensing boiler
Condensing osteitis